Ashraf Aliyev (born July 29, 1986) is a male freestyle wrestler. He participated in the  Men's freestyle 74 kg at the 2012 Summer Olympics.

References

External links
 

Olympic wrestlers of Azerbaijan
Wrestlers at the 2012 Summer Olympics
1986 births
Living people
Azerbaijani male sport wrestlers
People from Khizi District
World Wrestling Championships medalists
21st-century Azerbaijani people